The 2018 Wrestling World Cup - Women's freestyle was the first of a set of three Wrestling World Cups in 2018 which were held in Takasaki, Japan on 17–18 March 2018.

Pool stage

Pool A

Pool B

Medal Matches

Final ranking

See also
2018 Wrestling World Cup - Men's Greco-Roman
2018 Wrestling World Cup - Men's freestyle

References

External links

 Results book

Wrestling World Cup
2018 in sport wrestling
2018 in Japanese sport
International wrestling competitions hosted by Japan
Sport in Gunma Prefecture
March 2018 sports events in Japan
2018 in women's sport wrestling